17th May Stadium is a multi-purpose stadium located in Banjarmasin, Indonesia. It is currently used mostly for football matches.  The stadium holds 15,000 people. It is the home stadium of Barito Putera and Peseban Banjarmasin, which was considered one of the major football clubs in Indonesia in 1994/95 Premier Division.

History
The Stadium originally opened to the public on 17 May 1974 as a Multi-purpose stadium with a capacity around 5.000. It has undergone renovations three times. The first upgrade happened in 1988, with a second 2008 and a third in 2012.

References

Football venues in Indonesia
Buildings and structures in Banjarmasin
Multi-purpose stadiums in Indonesia
Buildings and structures in South Kalimantan
Sports venues completed in 1974
1974 establishments in Indonesia